Zargar is a village in Barakuh Rural District, Jolgeh-e Mazhan District, Khusf County, South Khorasan Province, Iran. As of the 2006 census, its population was 50, in 21 families.

References 

Populated places in Khusf County